The Merseyside derby is the football matches between Everton and Liverpool, the two primary clubs in Liverpool, England. Named after the county of Merseyside, in which Liverpool is located, it is the longest running top-flight derby in England and has been played continuously since the 1962–63 season. Part of the rivalry is due to the two clubs' home grounds having less than a mile between them and being within sight of each other across Stanley Park, with Everton at Goodison Park and Liverpool at Anfield.	

The Merseyside derby was traditionally referred to as the "friendly derby" because of the large number of families in the city with both Everton and Liverpool supporters, and it was one of the few that did not enforce total fan segregation. The 1984 Football League Cup final at Wembley was nicknamed the "friendly final" due to almost all sections of the ground being mixed and supporters of both teams banding together to chant "Merseyside". The 1986 FA Cup final witnessed similar scenes of solidarity. Since the mid-1980s, the rivalry has intensified on and off the field, and has seen more red cards given than any other game since the creation of the Premier League.

History
Everton FC were founded in 1878 and from 1884 played their home matches at Anfield, which was owned by club chairman John Houlding. Several board members of Everton were members of the Liberal Party, who were associated with the National Temperance Federation, whilst Houlding was a Conservative Party member and a brewer whose business interests were diametrically opposed to the temperance movement. Politics and disputes over money meant that Houlding was increasingly at odds with other members of the Everton board. Friction arose between the retention of an autocratic ownership structure versus the creation of a more democratic one which closely mapped the sociopolitical divide. The result was that the Everton directors vacated Anfield in 1892 and purchased a new ground at Goodison Park on the other side of Stanley Park. Houlding responded by creating a new club, Liverpool FC, to use Anfield.

The professional football clubs of the 1890s attracted much interest among the public, both on and off the field. The 1867 Reform Act had given what would become football-attending masses the opportunity to vote in the local and national elections. Everton and Liverpool attendances would reach around 10–15,000 in a local authority ward with a population of 23,000. Local politicians saw involvement in the two football clubs as an opportunity to gain media exposure to the local electorate. Irish roots and religion are also sometimes considered as theories for the split on the grounds that Houlding was a prominent Orange Order member, while Everton's new chairman George Mahon was a rival Liberal Home Rule-advocating MP. Orangemen are strongly Unionist, whereas someone favouring home rule for Ireland was in favour of some degree of separation of the whole island of Ireland from the UK. The city of Liverpool has more Irish blood than any other city in the UK, with the possible exception of Glasgow, and division between Protestant and Catholic groups in Ireland closely matched the division between Unionism and Republicanism in Liverpool. However, at the time of the split, James Clement Baxter was the only Catholic among the Everton committee members whereas the rest were Protestants.

The friendly derby
There are a number of reasons for the "friendly derby" name. Firstly, both of the clubs' home grounds are situated in the north of the city and are very close to each other (just under a mile) with only Stanley Park separating them. From 1902 to 1932, the two clubs even shared the same match day programme. Today there are no evident geographical, political, social, or religious divides as there are in other derbies, although a sectarian divide did exist within the city for many years. It is unclear how, if at all, this influenced the support bases of the two clubs and research conducted in 2013 indicated that it was more likely to have been a political allegiance that influenced support. During the 1950s and 1960s, Everton became known as the Catholic club mainly as a result of successful Irish players such as Tommy Eglington, Peter Farrell, and Jimmy O'Neill, as well as manager Johnny Carey. This in turn caused Liverpool to be thought of as Protestant club, especially as they did not sign an Irish Catholic player until Ronnie Whelan in 1979. However, this divide was never seen as a basis for supporting a certain side, as is the case with teams such as Celtic and Rangers. In truth, both teams have strong support from all denominations. Most importantly, the actual clubs themselves did not act to strengthen sectarian divides, and both stem from Methodist origins.

Unlike other local derbies, violence between Everton and Liverpool supporters in Liverpool itself is a rarity. In the fallout from the Heysel Stadium disaster, fan relationships became strained when the actions of Liverpool-supporting hooligans caused both Liverpool and Everton to be banned from European club competition despite no involvement from the latter. Relations improved after the Hillsborough disaster when both sets of fans rallied together, with Evertonians even joining in on the boycott of The Sun, while Everton and Liverpool scarves were intertwined and stretched across Stanley Park between the two teams' stadiums. After the murder of 11-year-old Evertonian Rhys Jones in 2007, Liverpool invited his parents and older brother to Anfield for a Champions League match as a sign of respect. The Z-Cars theme tune, to which Everton players traditionally run out, was played for the first time ever at Anfield while Jones' family stood on the pitch wearing Everton shirts and scarves. A standing ovation was then given before "You'll Never Walk Alone" was played. Upon the vindication of Liverpool fans related to the Hillsborough disaster in August 2012, Everton hosted Newcastle United at Goodison Park, and the sides were led out by two children wearing Everton and Liverpool shirts with numbers 9 and 6 on the back; an announcer read out the names of all 96 Hillsborough victims while "He Ain't Heavy, He's My Brother" played to a standing ovation.

Modern-day derbies
During the 1960s, Liverpool and Everton were regular winners of domestic trophies, but while Liverpool went from strength to strength in the 1970s and 1980s, Everton went through a relatively barren spell after their 1970 title triumph and did not win a major trophy for the next 14 years.

Everton, however, started to emerge as a serious threat to Liverpool's dominance of the domestic scene following the appointment of Howard Kendall as manager at the start of the 1981–82 season. The first Merseyside derby that Kendall oversaw was at Anfield on 7 November, when his side lost 3–1 to Bob Paisley's. This saw Liverpool standing seventh in the league and Everton 13th. An identical scoreline followed in the return game at Goodison Park in late March, by which time Liverpool had overcome a dismal start to the season to muscle in on a title race which they eventually won, while Everton were still mid-table.

In 1982–83, the final season of Bob Paisley's management before he retired to make way for Joe Fagan, Liverpool were champions once again with Everton finishing mid-table, and the most notable of the two derbies occurred in early November when Liverpool triumphed 0–5 at Goodison Park. The return match at Anfield in mid-March brought a goalless draw.

1983–84 was the season when Everton (who won the FA Cup at the end of the campaign) really started to emerge as a serious threat to Liverpool. Though Liverpool won the league title and Everton still couldn't even make the top five, Liverpool needed a replay to see off Everton 1–0 in the League Cup final at Wembley. The Anfield derby in early November saw Liverpool triumph 3–0, while the clash at Goodison Park four months later ended in a 1–1 draw.

The 1984–85 season began with a Merseyside derby in the FA Charity Shield at Wembley, when league champions Liverpool faced FA Cup winners Everton in a game which Everton won 1–0 due to an own goal by Bruce Grobbelaar. The first league clash came on 20 October 1984, when a 0–1 win for Everton at Anfield saw Howard Kendall's team occupy fourth place in the league and show signs of challenging for the title for the first time in his four seasons in charge, while Liverpool were a lowly 17th and just 2 points outside the relegation zone. Liverpool's final game of the season came on 23 May when they lost 1–0 to Everton (who still had two games left to play) at Goodison Park. Everton had been crowned champions by this stage, while Liverpool had rallied since their terrible start to the season to occupy second place.

1985–86 was perhaps the most exciting season for the fans of both clubs, as Liverpool and Everton battled it out for both the league title and the FA Cup. The first Merseyside derby of the season came at Goodison Park on 21 September 1985 and was won 2–3 by Liverpool, who stood second behind Manchester United while Everton occupied sixth place. Everton triumphed 0–2 in the return match at Anfield five months later, by which time Everton had just taken over from Manchester United as league leaders and Liverpool were eight points behind them in second place. The climax to this exciting campaign came at Wembley Stadium when Liverpool and Everton contested the first all Merseyside FA Cup final on 10 May 1986. An early goal by Gary Lineker suggested that Everton could gain revenge on Liverpool for beating them to the league title by defeating them in the FA Cup final, but in the second half the tables were turned as a double from Ian Rush and another goal from Craig Johnston made Liverpool only the fifth English club to complete the double.

The 1986 FA Charity Shield was shared between Liverpool and Everton, who drew 1–1 at Wembley, but the first league derby of the season between the two clubs did not happen until late November in a goalless draw at Goodison Park. Both clubs were challenging for the title at this stage alongside Arsenal (leaders), Nottingham Forest and unlikely contenders Luton Town and Coventry City. The League Cup quarter-final on 21 January 1987 saw Liverpool win 0–1 at Goodison Park. The Anfield derby in late April saw Liverpool triumph 3–1, but it was not enough to prevent Everton from winning the title within the next couple of weeks. The 1986–87 season was the last time that Everton overshadowed Liverpool.

In the 1988–89 season, Everton were Liverpool's first opponents in a competitive game after the Hillsborough disaster on 15 April 1989, which resulted in the deaths of 96 Liverpool fans at the FA Cup semi-final. The game between the two sides was a league fixture on 3 May which ended in a goalless draw. On 20 May, the two sides met at Wembley for the second all Merseyside FA Cup final in four seasons. The match went into extra time before Liverpool triumphed 3–2, with Ian Rush (twice) and John Aldridge scoring for Liverpool and both of Everton's goals coming from Stuart McCall.

By 1990–91, Everton were in something of a slump (finishing ninth that season having started the season near the foot of the table), while Liverpool finished second in the league, but the campaign still brought one of the most pulsating clashes between the two clubs. Liverpool and Everton were drawn for the FA Cup fifth round at Anfield on 17 February 1991. The match ended in a goalless draw, and the replay three days later ended in a thrilling 4–4 draw at Goodison Park, in which Peter Beardsley scored twice. 1990–91 was Kenny Dalglish's last season as Liverpool manager, as he resigned two days after the 4–4 draw with Everton. It was also the last season of "replays of replays" as penalties after extra time took over as the competition's ultimate tie winner decider for the 1991–92 season. The second replay ended with a 1–0 win for Everton on 27 February, and ended the Reds double hopes.

The close season of 1991 saw Peter Beardsley move from Liverpool to Everton, followed within a year by defender Gary Ablett, causing more tension in the Merseyside derby, though the first couple of years after their transfers saw Liverpool and Everton firmly overtaken by Manchester United and the likes of Blackburn Rovers and Arsenal as the biggest challengers in English football. On 7 December 1992, in the first derby of the Premier League era, Everton defeated Liverpool 2–1 at Goodison Park in a game where Peter Beardsley became only the second man in history to score for both clubs in the derby.

The 1993–94 derby at Anfield saw Liverpool defeat Everton 2–1, not having much effect for a mid-table Liverpool side but increasing the risk of relegation (a battle which was ultimately won) for Everton. Perhaps the most notable event of this game was the winning goal by Robbie Fowler, who turned 19 the following month and was one of the most promising young players in England at the time. It was the last Merseyside derby Liverpool would win for five years during a period of success for Everton in the fixture. Joe Royle's appointment as Everton manager in November 1994 following Mike Walker's dismissal began with a 2-0 win over Liverpool at Goodison Park which lifted Everton from the bottom of the table and saw Duncan Ferguson score his first goal for the club. Royle's team followed it up with an away win at Anfield with two goals from Andrei Kanchelskis the following season. Everton's derby form at Goodison Park, despite the club's travails through most of the decade, was a strong suit in the 1990s, with five victories and no defeats at home in the ten years from February 1991.

In 1997-98 Everton triumphed 2–0 at Goodison in a victory that ultimately saved them from relegation (they only stayed up by having a greater goal difference than Bolton Wanderers) and helped end Liverpool's title bid. The following season Liverpool would end their barren run with a 3–2 victory over Everton at Anfield.

The 2000–01 season saw one of the most exciting derbies of the Premier League era. Liverpool, having won the first derby at Anfield, completed the double with a thrilling 2–3 victory over Everton at Goodison in April, with the injury-time winner by Gary McAllister proving to be crucial at the end of the season in helping Liverpool qualify for the UEFA Champions League—which replaced the European Cup in 1992—for the first time.

By the end of the 2001–02, Liverpool had finished above Everton in the league for 15 seasons in succession. After a brilliant run of form saw Liverpool top the Premier League in October, an 11-match winless league run followed their 2–0 home win over West Ham United in early November and during that barren spell they drew 0–0 at home to an Everton side who were briefly above them in the table after several seasons of persistent relegation battles. However, they were on course for their fifth-place finish when they next met Everton on 19 April and won 1–2 at Goodison Park, a result which pushed their city neighbours towards seventh place and narrowly deprived them of European football.

In 2004–05, Everton finished fourth in the league and Liverpool came fifth, the first time since Everton's 1987 title win that Liverpool had finished below them. In a season which saw Liverpool win the Champions League title, Everton gave their neighbours a reminder of how far they had progressed under the management of David Moyes with a 1–0 win at Goodison Park on 11 December 2004, though Liverpool won the return match at Anfield 2–1 three months later.

Everton had a setback and finished mid-table in 2005–06, while Liverpool's compensation for their prolonged title wait came in the form of a narrow FA Cup final triumph. And Liverpool triumphed 3–1 in both of the Merseyside derbies that season.

In 2006–07, Everton recovered to finish in the top six, while Liverpool finished third, and there was an early season triumph for the blue half of Liverpool as Everton beat Liverpool 3–0 at Goodison Park in early September, in a game that saw an uncharacteristic mistake from Liverpool 'keeper Pepe Reina. They also held them to a goalless draw at Anfield in early February.

Liverpool did the double over Everton in 2007–08. The first meeting of the sides that season saw one of the most controversial derbies in recent memory, with Everton finishing an ill-tempered game with 9 men. Everton took a first half lead as Sami Hyypia skewed a left footed clearance into his own goal from a corner. The scoreline was levelled by Dirk Kuyt from the penalty spot after Everton's Tony Hibbert fouled Steven Gerrard in the area. Referee Mark Clattenburg earned the ire of the Goodison faithful as Steven Gerrard appeared to persuade him to change his mind in favour of a red card after first brandishing a yellow. Kuyt was fortunate to escape with a yellow card following a two-footed, aerial lunge on Phil Neville. Liverpool's pressure against the 10 men eventually told, as Liverpool were awarded a second penalty when Neville handled a goal bound shot from derby debutante Lucas Leiva. Neville was dismissed and Everton finished the game two players short. Kuyt scored his second goal of the game from the spot as Liverpool won the game 2–1. The victory helped secure a top-four finish and Champions League qualification for Liverpool, leaving Everton to settle for a UEFA Cup place. Referee Clattenburg was not chosen to officiate again at Goodison Park after that match until December 2013, six years later, and in that period only officiated one Everton game, away at Aston Villa.

In the 2008–09 season, Liverpool and Everton met four times, Liverpool winning the League encounter at Goodison Park 0–2 while drawing the other League fixture that dealt a blow to their title ambitions. The FA Cup saw Everton defeat ten-man Liverpool in extra time in the replay thanks to an injury-time winner by Dan Gosling after a 1–1 draw at Anfield. Both teams enjoyed strong campaigns in the Premier League, as Liverpool challenged for the title and Everton qualified for Europe finishing in fifth place and 9 points adrift of the Champions League places. Everton also progressed to the 2009 FA Cup Final, but lost to Chelsea, despite taking the lead through a Louis Saha goal after just 25 seconds - the fastest goal ever in an FA Cup Final.

When the sides met in the 2009–10 season, both clubs were suffering from a poor start to the season. Liverpool won the first meeting at Goodison Park with a 2–0 victory despite Everton enjoying a greater share of possession for the game, with poor finishing and the heroics of Pepe Reina costing the home side. The following game saw 10-man Liverpool win 1–0 following a first-half red card for Greek centre-half Sotirios Kyrgiakos. The Greek fiercely contested a tackle with Fellaini who was fortunate to escape similar punishment having caught the centre-back high on the shin. A solitary goal from Kuyt was enough to secure the three points, as the Dutchmen nodded home smartly from a Steven Gerrard corner.

In the Goodison Park encounter on 17 October 2010 in the 2010–11 season, Everton won 2–0 with goals from Tim Cahill and Mikel Arteta, while the return league game at Anfield in January 2011 ended in a 2–2 draw. This was the last win for Everton in the derby in all competitions for more than a decade,failing to win in the following 23 games whilst losing 11 times.

In the 2011–12 season, Liverpool and Everton met three times, twice in the league and once in the FA Cup, with Liverpool winning all three. The first meeting took place on 1 October 2011, with Liverpool winning 0–2 in the league at Goodison Park (goals from Andy Carroll and Luis Suárez) against an Everton side depleted by Jack Rodwell's early, controversial red card, which was later rescinded by The Football Association. On 13 March 2012, Liverpool won the Anfield fixture 3–0 after a hat-trick by Steven Gerrard, who became the first player to score a hat-trick in the derby since Ian Rush in 1982. The third meeting of the season was the FA Cup semi-final at Wembley on 14 April. Everton took the lead through Nikica Jelavić's goal in the first half. Liverpool equalized through a Luis Suárez goal midway through the second half, and Andy Carroll scored the winning goal for Liverpool in the 87th minute. However, despite Liverpool having success throughout the season against their traditional rivals, Everton finished one place higher than Liverpool at the end of the Premier League season, whilst the Reds finished the season as the winners of the League Cup.

In the 2013–14 season, the two sides contested an eventful 3–3 draw at Goodison Park, with the lead changing on three separate occasions between both teams. Later that season, Liverpool beat Everton 4–0 at Anfield during the beginning of an improbable title challenge for the Reds. The result was replicated in the 2015–16 season, as Liverpool again ran out 4–0 winners in Jürgen Klopp's first experience of the Merseyside derby. The game was notable for a Ramiro Funes Mori red card which saw in-form striker Divock Origi injured - the Belgian would miss the remainder of the season. The result ended a run of three consecutive draws in the fixture, which was Everton's best streak in the derby for six years.

Liverpool won both derbies in Klopp's first full season at the club, as dominance continued from the Red half of Merseyside. Sadio Mané scored an injury time winner at Goodison Park in December 2016, following a Daniel Sturridge left footed shot that rebounded off the post. The second meeting was a more straightforward affair for the Reds, with a 3–1 victory following goals from Mané, Philippe Coutinho and Origi.

In the 2017–18 season, Mohamed Salah scored a curling left footed effort for the Reds, which would go on to win the 2018 FIFA Puskás Award for goal of the year, picking up 38% of the public vote. The match ended in a 1–1 draw, after returning Evertonian Wayne Rooney equalized with a penalty.

In the following season, Divock Origi would score one of the most memorable goals ever witnessed in a Merseyside derby. With the score goalless after 90 minutes, Virgil van Dijk volleyed a speculative effort towards goal which skewed off his boot and high into the air. Everton goalkeeper Jordan Pickford attempted to catch the ball but missed, as it came back down off the crossbar in front of the waiting Origi, who nodded in the winner in the sixth minute of added time. The return game in March 2019 ended in a 0–0 draw at Goodison Park and saw Liverpool move down to second place, where they remained until the end of the season.

The first meeting of the following season saw Liverpool, whose Champions league win was some compensation for their failure to secure the Premier League, welcoming a struggling Everton to Anfield. The Reds had surged into an early lead at the top of the Premier League table while the Toffees sat just above the relegation zone, which lead to the derby being described as perhaps "the most unbalanced meeting" in recent years. Liverpool won the match 5–2 despite playing a rotated side, and soon after Everton sacked their manager, Marco Silva. The return league fixture, which was both sides' first match in the Premier League since the season had been halted due to the COVID-19 pandemic, was played on 21 June 2020 behind closed doors at Goodison Park, and ended in a goalless draw.

In between these two games, on 5 January 2020, a Liverpool team largely made up of reserves and teenagers defeated Everton 1–0 in the third round of the FA Cup at Anfield, with the winning goal coming from a curling strike outside of the area, courtesy of 18 year-old Toxteth born Curtis Jones.

The first meeting of the 2020–21 season saw Everton, with a 100 percent record after four games, welcome champions Liverpool to Goodison Park. The game ended in a 2–2 draw after Jordan Henderson’s strike to make it 3–2 to Liverpool in second half stoppage time was ruled out by VAR. With 23 matches unbeaten in the Merseyside derby, Liverpool set a new club record for highest number of games unbeaten against the same opponent. The record lasted only until the return game at Anfield on 20 February 2021, which Everton won 2–0, their first win at Anfield in any competition since 1999. The defeat was also a fourth consecutive home defeat for Liverpool, a run not endured since 1923.

In the 2021–22 season, goals from Henderson, Mohamed Salah (two) and Diogo Jota saw Liverpool record a 4–1 away win against Everton in the Premier League, the club's biggest winning margin at Goodison since a 5–0 win in 1982, as Liverpool became the first team in English top-flight history to score at least two goals in 18 successive games in all competitions. The victory also took Liverpool ahead of Everton in the number of wins in Everton's home stadium. In the reverse fixture at Anfield in April, Liverpool won 2-0, with a goal from  Andrew Robertson and Divock Origi's sixth goal matches against Everton. This was the first season since 2016-17 that Liverpool did the Double over their rivals.

Tranmere Rovers
Matches between Everton/Liverpool and Tranmere Rovers, based in Birkenhead on the other side of the River Mersey, are also classed as Merseyside derbies, but as Tranmere have spent all of their history outside the top flight, competitive matches are a rarity. They have occasionally faced Everton and Liverpool in cup competitions. Their last meeting with both clubs came in the FA Cup in 2001. Tranmere caused an upset by beating Everton 3–0 in the fourth round, before losing 4–2 to Liverpool in the quarter-finals.

Statistics

Honours

Records
This derby is responsible for many records across all derby matches, largely due to it being contested on so many occasions:
 The longest unbeaten derby run in all competitions is held by Liverpool, with Everton failing to find victory in 23 consecutive games between 2011 and 2020. This streak is also the longest such run that Liverpool have had against any opponent in club history.
 The longest unbeaten derby run in home matches is held by Liverpool, with Everton failing to win in the league (plus two cup games) for 22 games between 2000 and 2020.
 The longest unbeaten derby run in away matches is held by Everton, with a 16-match run at Anfield between 1899 and 1920, which included ten victories.
 The longest unbroken winning run at home belongs to Liverpool, with five wins between the 1932–33 and 1936–37 seasons.
 The longest unbroken winning run away from home belongs to Everton, who won seven consecutive games at Anfield between the 1908–09 and 1914–15 seasons.
 Recent games have been marred by sendings off, and the fixture has seen 23 red cards in the Premier League, the highest tally for any fixture (though the 20th of these was subsequently rescinded by the FA). Former Liverpool captain Steven Gerrard and former Everton captain Phil Neville  both saw red twice in derby games.

The following are records just for the Merseyside derby itself:
 The record home victory in a league match is 6–0, recorded by Liverpool at Anfield in the 1935–36 season.
 The record away victory in a league match is 5–0, recorded by both Everton at Anfield in the 1914–15 season, and by Liverpool at Goodison Park in the 1982–83 season.
 The highest-scoring match had 11 goals, when Liverpool won 7–4 at Anfield in the 1932–33 season.
 Neville Southall of Everton holds the record for most derby appearances, with 41 across all competitions.
 Ian Rush of Liverpool holds the mark for the most derby goals with 25, overtaking Dixie Dean of Everton's long-standing record when he scored a brace in Liverpool's 3–2 win over Everton in the second all-Merseyside FA Cup Final in 1989.
 William C. Cuff of Everton holds the record for the most wins as a manager, with 16 wins over Liverpool from 1901 to 1918.
 Tom Watson of Liverpool holds the record for the most losses as a manager, with 21 defeats to Everton from 1896 to 1915.
 Record attendance: 78,599 at Goodison Park, 18 September 1948 (First Division)
 Lowest attendance: 18,000 at Anfield, 19 January 1901 (First Division) (* does not include matches played behind closed doors due to the COVID-19 pandemic)

All-time top goalscorers

The following players have scored four or more goals in the derby. This includes Premier League matches, its predecessor the Football League First Division, the FA Cup, the League Cup, the Football League Super Cup and the Charity Shield. This list is correct as of the match played on 20 February 2021.

Dixie Dean is the top goalscorer in league games, with 18 goals, while Steven Gerrard is the top goalscorer in the fixture in the Premier League era, with 9 goals.

Current scorers: Current players with multiple derby goals include Liverpool's Mohamed Salah (5) and Everton's Michael Keane (2). 

Goals from "overseas" players: A total of 33 non-British (Isles) players from 20 countries have scored in the derby (not including own goals, which add four countries to the list) since Liverpool's Craig Johnston became the first such player to do so, in the 1986 Cup final (though Bruce Grobbelaar was the first non-British Isles player to get on the derby scoresheet with his own goal in the 1984 Charity Shield). Most recently Liverpool's Xherdan Shaqiri added the newest country (Switzerland) to this list. Divock Origi (Belgium) is the leading "overseas" player with six goals. In terms of countries, France leads the way with five different scorers, but Australia is just behind, with four.

More goals than years: Liverpool's Fred Howe and Everton's Tommy Lawton bear the distinction of scoring more goals than they actually spent in years in the city of Liverpool, with Howe scoring five goals in three years and Lawton four goals in three years.

Hat-tricks: The first derby hat-trick was scored by Everton's Alex "Sandy" Young, who scored four in a 5–1 win at Goodison in 1904. Other Evertonians to manage hat-ticks include Bobby Parker in 1914 and Dixie Dean twice, in 1928 and 1931, the last Everton player to net a treble. Liverpool hat-tricks have come from Chambers (1922), Forshaw (1925), Barton (1933) and Howe (four goals in 1935). Nearly fifty years passed before the next derby hat-trick, scored by Ian Rush, who managed four goals in a 5–0 win at Goodison in 1982; a further thirty years passed until Steven Gerrard scored a hat-trick against Everton at Anfield in a 3–0 win. Of all the league hat-tricks, only two (Young's in 1904 and Rush's in 1982) were managed at Goodison; all the others were at Anfield.

Own goals: Sandy Brown's famous own goal in Everton's championship winning 1969–70 season was, surprisingly, only the second own goal in the history of the fixture, the first having been scored by Balmer (Everton) in 1902. Since then, eight Evertonians have been "credited" with an own goal, including two in the same match at Anfield in 1972. There have only been three Liverpool own goals. Leighton Baines's unlucky deflection at Goodison in 2012–13 is the most recent of all derby-day own goals.

Scoring in consecutive matches: Between May and September 1986, Ian Rush scored for Liverpool in four consecutive derbies, none of them league games (Cup final, Charity Shield and two Super Cup finals). Several players have scored in three consecutive games: Hardman (Everton, 1905–06), Freeman (Everton, 1909–10), Parkinson (Liverpool, 1910–11), King (Everton, 1978–79), Lineker (Everton, 1985–86), Barnes (Liverpool, 1989–90) and Fowler (Liverpool, 1995–96).

Youngest derby goalscorer: Although difficult to verify, since birthdates of early players are not always known, the youngest confirmed derby goalscorer is Everton's Danny Cadamarteri, who scored the winner at Goodison six days after his 18th birthday in October 1997.

All-time most appearances

Clean sheets

Top 10 attendances for League derby games

Decade average attendances for derby games

League games only. Highest ever attendance 100,000 estimate at 1984 Milk Cup final and 1984 Charity Shield. Highest attendance at Anfield 56,060 for the 1962–63 league game. 
 Not including matches played behind closed doors due to COVID-19 pandemic.

Games on neutral ground
There have been twelve derby games played on neutral grounds: six at Wembley (both the old and new grounds), four at Maine Road and one each at Villa Park and Old Trafford:

Penalties
Since the war, Everton have been awarded just three penalties during Anfield derbies (all scored), while Liverpool have had eleven at Goodison, of which three have been missed (though only one of these misses affected the final result). A full list is available here.

Crossing the park

Players transferring between the clubs are said to be "crossing the Park". The phrase refers to Stanley Park, which lies between Anfield and Goodison Park. Since Liverpool were formed when Everton left Anfield, which had been their home ground, the two players who stayed behind (Duncan McLean and Thomas G. Wylie) did not actually cross the park. The first player to have had both Anfield and Goodison as his home ground was Patrick Gordon.

Transfer embargo: Liverpool did not buy directly from Everton between 1959 and 2000, while there was a similar freeze in the opposite direction between 1961 and 1982.

Played for all three: Dave Hickson, John Heydon and Frank Mitchell are the only three players to have played for Liverpool, Everton and Tranmere Rovers, the three main Merseyside clubs still in existence. New Brighton were football league members from 1923 to 1951; Bill Lacey and Neil McBain played for all three of Everton, Liverpool and New Brighton. John Whitehead played for Liverpool, Everton and also for Bootle in their one year as a league team (1892–93), before they were replaced in Division 2 by local rivals Liverpool FC.

The list below shows transfer dates and fees, where known.

Everton, then Liverpool

 Abel Xavier – 2002 – £750,000 (only player to play in derby matches for both teams in the same season)
 Nick Barmby – 2000 – £6 million (the highest fee Liverpool have paid Everton)
 Dave Hickson – 1959 – £12,000 (also played for Tranmere Rovers one of six players to play for three different Merseyside clubs)
 Tony McNamara – 1957 – £4,000
 John Heydon – 1949 – no fee (also played for Tranmere Rovers, one of six players to play for three different Merseyside clubs)
 Bill Harthill – 1936
 Jack Balmer – 1935 – no fee
 Thomas Johnson – 1934
 Frank Mitchell – 1919 (also played for Tranmere Rovers, one of six players to play for three different Merseyside clubs)
 Bill Lacey – 1912 – part of exchange deal for Uren (Lacey also played for New Brighton, one of six players to have played for three different Merseyside clubs) 
 Tom Gracie – 1912 – part of exchange deal for Uren
 Arthur Berry – Signed first for Liverpool in 1906, then played for Wrexham, Fulham, and Oxford University before signing for Everton. He returned directly to Liverpool from Everton for a brief spell in 1912.
 Don Sloan – 1908 – no fee
 David Murray – 1904
 Abe Hartley – 1897
 Alex Latta – 1896 (Did not make a senior appearance for Liverpool)
 Fred Geary – 1895 – £60
 John Whitehead – 1894 – (also played for Bootle), one of six players to have played for three different Merseyside clubs
 Patrick Gordon – 1893
 Duncan McLean – 1892; along with Wylie, the only two players to stay at Liverpool when Everton left Anfield. 
 Thomas G. Wylie – 1892

The following played for other clubs before moving to Liverpool:
 Andrew Hannah – Played for Renton in between. (The first player to captain both Everton and Liverpool)
 Edgar Chadwick – Played for Blackburn Rovers and Burnley in between.
 David Johnson- Played for Ipswich Town in between; returned to Everton after playing for Liverpool.
 Neil McBain – Played for St Johnstone in between. He also played – under bizarre circumstances – one game for New Brighton: as manager he played one game in goal due to an injury crisis, at the age of 52, becoming the oldest player ever to play in a league game. He is one of six players to play for three different Merseyside clubs.
 Steve McMahon – Played for Aston Villa in between. He is also one of only two players to have captained both Everton and Liverpool.
 Darren Potter – Everton youth player who never made a first-team appearance, played for Blackburn Rovers in between.
 Billy Scott – Played for Leeds City in between.

Liverpool, then Everton
 Gary Ablett – 1992 – £750,000 (only player to win the FA Cup with both clubs).
 Peter Beardsley – 1991 – £1 million; was Everton's most expensive signing from Liverpool.
 Alan Harper – 1983 – £100,000; though on Liverpool's books, he never made a first-team appearance.
 Kevin Sheedy – 1982 – £100,000.
 David Johnson – 1982 – £100,000; started at Everton, went to Ipswich Town then Liverpool then back to Everton.
 Johnny Morrissey –1962 – £10,000
 Jimmy Payne – 1956 – £5,000
 Dick Forshaw – 1927 – only player to win the League Championship with both clubs
 Harold Uren – 1912 – part of exchange deal for Lacey and Gracie
 Benjamin Howard Baker – c. 1910

The following played for other clubs before moving to Everton:
 David Burrows – Played for West Ham United in between.
 Don Hutchison – Played for West Ham United and Sheffield United in between.
 Dave Watson – Played for Norwich City in between.
 John Gidman – Played for Aston Villa in between.
 Sander Westerveld – Played for Real Sociedad and Portsmouth before joining Everton on loan.
 Arthur Berry – Played for Wrexham, Fulham, and Oxford University in between Everton; returned to Liverpool for a brief spell in 1912.
 Andy Lonergan – Played for Stoke City and West Bromwich Albion before joining Everton.
 Conor Coady – Played for Sheffield United, Huddersfield and Wolves before joining Everton on loan.

As well as players "crossing the park," Everton's first ever manager, William Edward Barclay, stayed on at Anfield after Everton moved to Goodison Park to become Liverpool's first manager.

On 30 June 2021, former Liverpool manager Rafael Benítez signed a three-year contract with Everton. He was fired on 16 January 2022.

Scored for both sides in a derby
Only two players have scored for both sides in a Merseyside derby:
 David Johnson famously scored on his derby debut for Everton in November 1971, then scored two derby goals during his spell with Liverpool, the last of them on 1 March 1980.
 Peter Beardsley added to his tally of six derby goals for Liverpool with one for Everton on 7 December 1992.

Boyhood allegiances

Liverpool's Evertonians

Everton's Liverpudlians

Doing the double
It is a rarity for either team to beat the other in both league games of a season; it is a feat managed by Liverpool sixteen times and Everton nine times, in what is known as the 'double'. With the occasional meeting at Wembley, both Everton and Liverpool have completed a 'treble', in which a victory has been achieved three times (and at three different venues) in a season.

Everton

 Having won the Charity Shield 1–0, Everton completed a treble over Liverpool.

Liverpool

 With a 2–1 win in the FA Cup semi-finals, Liverpool completed a treble over Everton.

With cup games, replays, and so on, the two have often met three or four times a season, but in the 1986–87 season, they played each other six times: starting with a 1–1 draw at Wembley in the Charity Shield, there were the two league games, the two-legged Screen Sport Super Cup Final (held over from the previous season), and a League Cup 5th round tie. Despite the fact that Everton finished the season as champions, they could not beat Liverpool that year, with four losses and two draws. A combined total of 281,356 spectators saw the six matches. The following season they met a further four times, being paired in both cups: honours were even with two wins each.

Liverpool have achieved the most Premier League doubles over their city rivals Everton, doing so four times in the last ten years. Everton have yet to do the double over Liverpool in the Premier League – their last league double over Liverpool was in 1985 when they won 1–0 on both legs to complete a treble for that season, having also won at Wembley in the Charity Shield.

Full list of results
Fixtures from 1894 to the present day featuring League games, FA Cup, League Cup, Charity Shield and Super Cup sorted from the most recent. Testimonial matches are listed separately. Other friendlies and Inter-War fixtures are not included.

Testimonials

See also

List of association football rivalries in the United Kingdom
Liverpool F.C.–Manchester United F.C. rivalry

External links

Everton FC
Liverpool FC
Map of Club locations
Complete Details on all Games
 – Merseyside derby in 1902
Memorable Merseyside derbies

References

England football derbies
Everton F.C.
Liverpool F.C.
Sport in Liverpool